Black Cat is the thirteenth studio album by the Italian blues rock singer-songwriter Zucchero Fornaciari, released on 29 April 2016. It's his first full-length studio album in six years, after Chocabeck in 2010, given that La Sesión Cubana (2012) was a mix of unreleased, previously released and cover songs.

Overview
The album is marked by music which goes back to soul & blues roots and the sound of the famous Oro Incenso & Birra (1989). According to Zucchero, the album does not have the meaning of Western prejudice of black cat, yet Afro-American for "figure of speech, a greeting, a symbol of auspice". As well there is a component of anarchism toward the "market rules". It is his "darkest album and rough ever in terms of sonority".

On CNN it was announced that the album would have included a new song "Streets of Surrender (S.O.S)" with lyrics written by Bono, dedicated to the victims of November 2015 Paris attacks. Mark Knopfler from Dire Straits is a special guest and guitarist on the song, as well "Ci si arrende". The single "Voci" is sampled by "Ignorant Boy, Beautiful Girl" by Loney, Dear, while "Ten More Days" is a cover by Avicii.

The album's English version includes a collaboration with Elvis Costello on "Love Again" (originally "Turn the World Down"), a Spanish version collaboration with Alejandro Sanz on "Fatti di sogni" (renamed as "Hechos de sueños"), while on Japanese version guitarist Tomoyasu Hotei played on "Ti voglio sposare".

The album was presented at the record-breaking 11 consecutive concerts at the Arena in Verona in September 2016, and following the Black Cat World Tour. The Arena concerts, held between 16 and 28 September, were the only concerts in Italy in that year, and were special events with vast and diverse repertoire of old and new songs, and diverse special guests. With 11 more concerts at the Arena in 2017, Zucchero broke his own record, ending with three residencies and 22 concerts in one year in that location.

Composition
Zucchero recounts that the album was "born" during the tour in Southern parts of United States (2013). He played in cities like New Orleans, Nashville, Lafayette, and immersed himself in their blues sounds, with guitars played with bottlenecks. He wanted to reproduce sounds from films like 12 Years a Slave and Django Unchained.

He wrote the songs like in the early days when everything was simpler as didn't have nothing to lose, and didn't care about the logic of the market. He intended to have different "dress" for each song, thus entrusted seven different songs to each of album producers T Bone Burnett, Brendan O'Brien, Don Was, of which twelve were chosen. The songs show "social obligation", and few gospel songs lyrics talk about "new slaves": the migrants.

In the single Partigiano Reggiano (Partisan from Reggio) a verse sings Bella ciao. Although the Reggio Emilia province was "red", and his uncle during World War II was deported to Germany, he "speak not of right or left, but someone who has ideals and that is ready to make wall against what does not work".

Release
The album was released on 29 April 2016 by Universal, in CD, standard vinyl and limited edition red vinyl. It was released in three different versions; Italian, International (with English and Spanish version), Japanese. The song "Partigiano Reggiano" is album's first single in Italy, released 24 March, while "Voci (Namanama Version)" the album's first single internationally, released 25 March.

Track listing

Charts

Weekly charts

Year-end charts

Certifications

References

2016 albums
Zucchero Fornaciari albums
Albums produced by T Bone Burnett
Albums produced by Brendan O'Brien (record producer)
Albums produced by Don Was
Rhythm and blues albums by Italian artists